Eshaqabad (also Romanized as Esḩāqābād and Esḩaqābād; also known as Eslḩāqābād and Ishāqābād) is a village in Chehel Cheshmeh-ye Gharbi Rural District, Sarshiv District, Saqqez County, Kurdistan Province, Iran. At the 2006 census, its population was 358, in 66 families. The village is populated by Kurds.

References 

Towns and villages in Saqqez County
Kurdish settlements in Kurdistan Province